Theano Didot is a free and open-source typeface by Alexey Kryukov, released under the Open Font License (OFL) in 2007. It is a revival of the Didot typeface of Firmin Didot, in the Didone or modern serif genre of the early nineteenth century. 

Theano Didot is one of three fonts in the Theano family, including an old-style serif and a Didone font more suitable for body text. Each is released in a single weight without italic.

About
Theano Didot is one of three typefaces created by Alexey Kryukov. He states that its initial purpose was to create a typeface for Greek texts, but later on he decided to add also Cyrillic and Latin.

As the Theano typefaces are released under the Open Font Licence, they may be used also for commercial purposes.

See also
 Didot - includes coverage of the original font and other digitisations.

External links
Webpage about Alexey Kryukov's work at Luc Devroye's website
Theano Didot font by Alexey Kryukov - download page for all the Theano fonts and Kryukov's larger family Old Standard (but outdated, without the cyrillic glyphs)
Fontspace - last version of Theano Didot

Modern serif typefaces
Free software Unicode typefaces
Greek typefaces
Typefaces and fonts introduced in 2007